The Dallas–Fort Worth Film Critics Association Award for Best Supporting Actor is an award presented by the Dallas–Fort Worth Film Critics Association. It is given in honor of an actor who has delivered an outstanding performance in a supporting role.

Winners
 † = Winner of the Academy Award for Best Supporting Actor

1990s

2000s

2010s

2020s

External links
 Official website

Supporting Actor
Film awards for supporting actor